Khakassia is a region in Russia.  The Khakas people are Turkic, and their culture, including music, has some similarities to the culture of Tuva, a neighboring region in Central Asia.  Like Tuva, throat-singing is practiced in Khakassia, often accompanied by a two-stringed instrument called the khomys.  A bridge zither called jadagan is also used.

The city of Abakan has hosted the International Khakass Folk Music Competition since 1995. Musicians include Anna Burnakova, Sergey Charkov, Slava Kuchenov, Aleksandr Samozhikov, Yevgeniy Ulugbashev. Folk music ensembles include Aylanys, Sabjilar, Ulgher, Khyrkhaas.

External links
 Traditional and modern Khakas conceptions of sound and music

Khakassia
Khakassia
Khakassia